Saul is a village and former civil parish, now in the parish of Fretherne with Saul, in the Stroud district, in the county of Gloucestershire, England. In 1881 the parish had a population of 597. On 24 March 1884 the parish was abolished to form Fretherne with Saul; part also went to Moreton Valance and Standish.

Saul Junction 

The village lends its name to the nearby junction of the Stroudwater Navigation and the Gloucester and Sharpness Canal, a unique example of a crossing between two separately-owned canals.

This is a popular and busy area, with three swing bridges, an active boatyard including dry dock, a visitor centre operated by the Cotswold Canals Trust and a Canal & River Trust office, historically significant listed structures, a rowing club, car parks and a café, a marina including chandlery, boat hire and charitable excursions, extensive towpath moorings, a variety of walking routes around and along the two canals, and community events such as carol singing at Christmastime.

A pillbox that was part of the British anti-invasion preparations of the Second World War can still be found on the banks of the canal - Canal & River Trust volunteers have converted it into a safe roost for endangered pipistrelle bats.

Notable residents 
 William John Westwood (1925–1999), the 36th Anglican Bishop of Peterborough, was born in Saul.

References

External links 

Villages in Gloucestershire
Former civil parishes in Gloucestershire
Stroud District